Kalinas (Polish: Kalin) is a village in Vilnius District Municipality, Riešė Eldership. It is located 2 kilometers northeast of Didžioji Riešė, by the Riešė river.

HistoryKalinas. Tarybų Lietuvos enciklopedija, T. 2 (Grūdas-Marvelės). – Vilnius: Vyriausioji enciklopedijų redakcija, 1986. p. 184. 
In 1861, a 200-hectare land in present-day Kalinas was bought by a manor lord and engineer from Vilnius and named Miedziechowszczyzna                   (Lithuanian: Miedziechovščyzna). Later, the area was renamed to Kalin.

The village was formerly known as Medikiškės, later Kalina.

For a short period during the Soviet occupation, it was a local administrative centre.

References 

Villages in Vilnius County